{{DISPLAYTITLE:C16H17N3O3}}
The molecular formula C16H17N3O3 (molar mass: 299.325 g/mol, exact mass: 299.1270 u) may refer to:

 Amonafide
 Menitrazepam

Molecular formulas